The Meekatharra slider (Lerista eupoda) is a species of lizard from the genus Lerista of the family Scincidae, described by Smith in 1996. According to Catalogue of Life Lerista eupoda do not have known subspecies.

Distribution 
14 km NNE of Cue, Australia.

References 

Skinks of Australia
Reptiles described in 1996
Lerista
Taxa named by Lawrence Alec Smith